German submarine U-131 was a Type IXC U-boat of Nazi Germany's Kriegsmarine during World War II.

Built at the DeSchiMAG AG Weser shipyard in Bremen, she was laid down on 1 September 1940, launched on 1 April 1941, and commissioned on 1 July 1941, with Korvettenkapitän Arend Baumann in command.

Design
German Type IXC submarines were slightly larger than the original Type IXBs. U-131 had a displacement of  when at the surface and  while submerged. She had two shafts and two  propellers.

U-131 was fitted with six  torpedo tubes (four fitted at the bow and two at the stern), 22 torpedoes, one  SK C/32 naval gun, 180 rounds, and a  SK C/30 as well as a  C/30 anti-aircraft gun. The boat had a complement of forty-eight.

Service history

U-131 sailed from Kiel on her first and only patrol on 27 November 1941.

On 6 December she torpedoed and sank the 4,016 ton British cargo ship Scottish Trader, a straggler from convoy SC 56, en route from Philadelphia to Liverpool, south of Iceland. All 43 of the crew perished.

On 17 December U-131 was spotted by a Grumman Martlet aircraft from the escort carrier  while shadowing Convoy HG 76 as part of the Seeräuber (English: "Pirate", lit. "Sea Robber") wolfpack.

Detected by Stanleys ASDIC (sonar), she was depth charged by Pentstemon, and forced to surface, due to chlorine gas coming from the batteries. Unable to dive, she attempted to escape by running at full speed on the surface. While under pursuit U-131 shot down an attacking Martlet aircraft, killing the pilot, but was then shelled by the escort group, which scored several hits. Realizing that the situation was hopeless, the crew abandoned the U-boat and scuttled her. All 47 of the crew survived and were taken prisoner.

Wolfpacks
U-131 took part in one wolfpack, namely:
 Seeräuber (14 – 17 December 1941)

Summary of raiding history

References

Bibliography

External links

German Type IX submarines
U-boats commissioned in 1941
U-boats scuttled in 1941
World War II submarines of Germany
1941 ships
World War II shipwrecks in the Atlantic Ocean
U-boats sunk by British warships
Ships built in Bremen (state)
Maritime incidents in December 1941